Georgia Veterans State Park (originally the Georgia Veterans Memorial State Park) is a state park located on Lake Blackshear in Crisp County, west of Cordele, Georgia. It was established on December 4, 1946 as a memorial to U.S. Veterans. The  park features a museum with aircraft, vehicles, weapons, uniforms and other memorabilia dating from the Revolutionary War to the present.

Other attractions include  Lake Blackshear, a privately operated conference center and golf club and the SAM Shortline Excursion Train, which runs from Cordele to Plains.

In 2013, Georgia Veterans State Park was privatized and its management handed over to Coral Hospitality, a Florida-based hotel and resort management company.

Facilities 
 82 campsites with cable TV hookups for tents, trailers or RVs
 Pioneer campground
 18-hole golf course
 Lake Blackshear Resort
 Conference Center
 Beach
 Marina
 Cypress Grill & The Comedy Zone
 78 rooms
 10 cottages
  nature trail
 Four picnic shelters
 Group shelter that seats 150
 R/C model airplane flying field

Activities 

 Boating
 Waterskiing
 Pontoon Boat Rentals
 Archery and Air Soft Rifle Range
 Hiking
 Bike Rentals
 Fishing
 Birdwatching
 Disc Golf
 Veteran's Museum
 Sam Shortline Train

The fish in Lake Blackshear include bass, crappie, catfish and bream.

Photos

References

External links 

 Georgia Veterans State Park information
 Lake Blackshear Resort & Golf Club
 Sam Shortline
 Georgia Veterans Memorial State Park Camp Safety Patrol historical marker

Protected areas of Crisp County, Georgia
State parks of Georgia (U.S. state)
Military monuments and memorials in the United States
Military and war museums in Georgia (U.S. state)
Museums in Crisp County, Georgia
Protected areas established in 1931
1931 establishments in Georgia (U.S. state)